The Baluch is  a Muslim community found in the state of Uttar Pradesh, India. They are descended from Baloch tribesmen who settled in this region of North India in the late Middle Ages. The community use the surname Khan, and are often known as Khan Baloch.

History and origin
In the 16th century, some of the Baloch moved into Sindh (where they are known as the Sindhi Baloch) and also into Punjab.

Mir Jalal Khan was one of the Baloch historical rulers, and from his four sons— Rind, Lashari, Hooth and Korai spring the four main Baloch tribes. The Jatoi are the children of Jato, Jalal Khan's daughter. These main sections are now divided into innumerable septs. Historically, in Uttar Pradesh and Haryana, the term Baloch denoted any Muslim camel-man. The word has come to be associated with the care of camels, because the Baloch settlers of the Western plains have taken to the grazing and breeding of camels rather than to husbandry.

In the middle of the 17th century the Brahuis, with the help of Turks, took advantage of the Balochis weakness after the Rind-Lashari war which lasted for 30 years and had driven them out of the Kalat valley. Yielding to pressure they moved eastward into the Sulaiman Mountains, drove out the Pashtuns, and settled along the banks of the Indus. According to Dr. Akhtar Baloch, Professor at University of Karachi, the Balochis migrated from Balochistan during the Little Ice Age and settled in Sindh and Punjab. The Little Ice Age is conventionally defined as a period extending from the sixteenth to the nineteenth centuries, or alternatively, from about 1300 to about 1850. Although climatologists and historians working with local records no longer expect to agree on either the start or end dates of this period, which varied according to local conditions. According to Professor Baloch, the climate of Balochistan was very cold and the region was inhabitable during the winter so the Baloch people migrated in waves and settled in Sindh and Punjab. The three Baloch adventurers Ismail Khan, Fatteh Khan, and Ghazi Khan, founded the three Dehras (encampments) that bear their names, and established themselves as independent rulers of the Lower Derajat and Muzaffargarh, which they and their descendants held for nearly 300 years. The three brothers founded the settlements of Dera Ghazi Khan, Dera Ismail Khan and Darya Khan. Thence the southern Balochis gradually spread into the valleys of the Indus, Chenab, and Sutlej, and in 1555 a large body of Balochis, under their great leader Mir Chakar, accompanied the Emperor Humayun into India. It is probable that many of the Baloch settlements, in North India (Haryana and western Uttar Pradesh), were founded by Humayun's soldiers. Mir Chakar settled in Sahiwal and his tomb still exists at Satgarha, where he founded a military colony of Rinds.

Baloch of the Doab 

Now the most important Baloch colonies in Uttar Pradesh are those of Amirnagar, Faridnagar, Ghaziabad, Garhi Abdullah Khan (Kachhi Garhi), Garhi Pukhta (Pakki Garhi), Jasoi and Baghra in Muzaffarnagar District they all villages were conquered by baloch during Mughal Emperor Aurangzeb Time. Sher Khan, Amir Khan, Bairam khan, Hashim Khan and their sister's husband Abdullah Khan they all were from  Baloch families. They settled in the district during the rule of the Aurangzeb, and rose to prominence as the Mughal Empire disintegrated. Another two prominent Baloch families were those of Tajpuri and Jhajhar, in Bulandshahr District. The Tajpuri Baloch are descended from Nahar Khan, who is said to have from Seistan during the rule of Alauddin Khalji. Nahar Khan was later appointed governor of Deccan, and his son Sardar Khan founded a settlement in Ganaura Shaikh, and the family rose to some prominence during the rule of the Aurangzeb. While the Jhajhar family claim descent from Syed Mohammad Khan, a Baloch, who was granted a jagir by the Mughal Emperor Humayun. They played a key role in the post-Mughal history of the Doab region, but began to decline with the rise of British power in the 19th century.

Tufail Ahmed Khan Baloch migrated from India to Pakistan after the partition of India in 1947. He helped many others Muslim refugees from India to settle in Pakistan. Presently many Tajpuri Baloch are settled in Karachi, Hyderabad, Lahore, Islamabad, and different parts of Pakistan.

The Baloch of Haryana emigrated to Pakistan at the time of independence in 1947. The Baloch now speak Urdu and the Khari Boli dialect, and are found in the Doab region of Uttar Pradesh.

The hamlet of Bilochpura alone is home to approximately 8,000 Balochis.

Baloch of Rohilkhand 

The Balochs of Rohilkhand accompanied Hafiz Rahmat Khan, Rohilla conqueror. They have now been assimilated into the Rohilla community, and lost their distinct Baloch identity. The Rohilkhand Baloch belong mainly to the Magsi, Leghari and Mazari tribes. These Baloch are found mainly in the districts of Bareilly, Badaun, Bijnor, Shahjahanpur and Moradabad.

There is also a single settlement of Baloch in Lucknow District, at Baluchgarhi. These Baloch are descendants of mercenaries brought by the Nawabs of Awadh.

Present circumstances
The Baloch of North India are now altogether separated from the Baloch tribes of Balochistan and tribal divisions are no longer important. They are found in the districts of Meerut, Muzaffarnagar, Bulandshar and Aligarh. Their customs are similar to those of the neighbouring Muslim communities such as the Jhojha and Ranghar. The Baloch reside in mixed Muslim villages, occupying their own quarters, and are largely small and medium-sized farmers, with a small number being landless agricultural labourers. Their most important settlements are in several villages in and around the town of Baghra in Muzaffarnagar District. A second cluster of Baloch villages exist in Bulandshahr District, where there are several villages near the towns of Jhajhar and Chanderu. In addition, the town of Faridnagar in Ghaziabad District is home to an important colony of Baloch. They marry with other Muslim communities and some members are endogamous, marrying within close kin, and like other North Indian Muslim communities. The Baloch practice both cross cousin and parallel cousin marriages. They speak both Urdu and Khari Boli, the local dialect in the Doab region of Uttar Pradesh.

The Baloch are almost entirely Sunni Hanafi Muslims, and like other Doab Muslim communities have been influenced by the Deobandi reformist movement. They have no formal community association, although most villages with Baloch do have traditional associations, known as panchayats. These panchayats exercise social control, and are deal with intra community disputes.

The Baloch of Balochgarhi in Lucknow District considers themselves simply as a sub-group of the Pathan, with whom they intermarry. They speak the Awadhi dialect, as well as standard Urdu. The community are mainly small and medium-sized farmers, although historically many were employed by the state police. They have no connection with the Baloch of the Doab. There are also small number of Baloch colonies in Sitapur, Kheri and Hardoi. Many of the Awadh Baloch are Shia.

See also
 Baloch diaspora
 Punjabi Baloch
 Sindhi Baloch

References

Social groups of Pakistan
Social groups of Uttar Pradesh
Muslim communities of India
Muslim communities of Uttar Pradesh
Uttar Pradesh